Hayden Beltz (born 8 September 1997) is a field hockey player from Australia.

Personal life
Hayden Beltz was born and raised in Hobart, Tasmania.

He has an older brother, Joshua, who is a member of the Australian senior national team.

Career

Club hockey
In 2018, Beltz was signed to play for Surbiton in the England Hockey League for the 2018–2019 season. During his time at Surbiton, Beltz also represented the team during the 2018–2019 EHL.

Domestic leagues

Australian Hockey League
Hayden Beltz made his Australian Hockey League (AHL) debut in 2015 representing his home state Tasmania as a member of the Tassie Tigers. During his four–season career with the Tigers, Beltz won bronze at two tournaments, in 2015 and during the final edition of the tournament in 2018.

Hockey One
After the overhaul of the AHL and introduction of the Hockey One, Beltz was named in a rebranded Tassie Tigers team for the inaugural edition of the competition.

National programs

Under–21
Beltz was a member of the Australia U–21 side, the 'Burras', from 2015–2018. During this time, he represented the team at two Sultan of Johor Cup's in 2015 and 2018, winning a bronze medal at the latter.

National development squad
In 2019, Beltz was named in the Australian development squad for the first time.

References

External links
 
 
 

1997 births
Living people
Australian male field hockey players
Sportspeople from Hobart